Ivan Mikitavič Sierada ( — after 19 November 1943), better known by the pseudonyms of Jan or Janka was a Belarusian statesman, pedagogist and writer who served as the first president of the Rada of the Belarusian Democratic Republic.

Biography
Ivan Mikitavič Sierada was born in the Zadźvieji village in the Minsk Governorate of the Russian Empire (now in the Brest Region of Belarus).

From 1905 to 1906, Sierada served in the Imperial Russian Army in Manchuria during the Russo-Japanese War, and was also mobilized during World War I.

He graduated from a veterinary school in Warsaw in 1903 and worked as a veterinarian in the Minsk Governorate in 1907—1911. At the same time he was a teacher at an agricultural college in Marjina Horka.

Jan Sierada was an active member of the Belarusian Socialist Assembly. In 1917 he was elected the chairman of the First All-Belarusian Congress. In 1918, he was elected president of the short-lived Belarusian Democratic Republic. In February 1918, he was a member of the Belarusian delegation (together with Simon Rak-Mikhailovsky and Alaksandar Ćvikievič) at the peace talks in Brest-Litovsk.

In the 1920s, Sierada worked on different positions in the Agriculture Ministry of the Byelorussian Soviet Socialist Republic, and was also a teacher at several colleges and published several works on agriculture.

On 4 July 1930, Sierada was arrested by the NKVD as part of the so-called Case of the Union of Liberation of Belarus. In April 1931, he was sentenced to 5 years of exile in Yaroslavl, in the Russian Soviet Federative Socialist Republic. After this, he was again sentenced in 1941 to 10 more years in the Gulag. He was set free, on 19 November 1943, from the gulag camp chain (Krasnoyarsk Krai) and his further fate is unknown.

He has been rehabilitated on his cases in 1988 and 1989.

Works 

 Yak treba kavats horses. Mn., 1926.
Veterinary and zoohygiene. Book. 1-2. Mn., 1927-1928.
Pabudov's strength in Kalgas and Saugas. Mn., 1930.

Notes

References

 Маракоў Л.У. Рэпрэсаваныя літаратары, навукоўцы, работнікі асветы, грамадскія і культурныя дзеячы Беларусі, 1794-1991. Энц. даведнік. У 10 т. Т.2. —Мн:, 2003. 

1879 births
People from Baranavichy District
People from Novogrudsky Uyezd
Belarusian Socialist Assembly politicians
Belarusian socialists
Government ministers of Belarus
Members of the Rada of the Belarusian Democratic Republic
Warsaw Veterinary Institute alumni
Belarusian people of World War I
Russian military personnel of World War I
Russian military personnel of the Russo-Japanese War
Academic staff of Belarusian Agricultural Academy
Heads of state of states with limited recognition
Belarusian scientists
Belarusian prisoners and detainees
Nonpersons in the Eastern Bloc
Year of death missing